In geometry, a point group in three dimensions is an isometry group in three dimensions that leaves the origin fixed, or correspondingly, an isometry group of a sphere. It is a subgroup of the orthogonal group O(3), the group of all isometries that leave the origin fixed, or correspondingly, the group of orthogonal matrices. O(3) itself is a subgroup of the Euclidean group E(3) of all isometries.

Symmetry groups of geometric objects are isometry groups. Accordingly, analysis of isometry groups is analysis of possible symmetries. All isometries of a bounded (finite) 3D object have one or more common fixed points. We follow the usual convention by choosing the origin as one of them.

The symmetry group of an object is sometimes also called its full symmetry group, as opposed to its proper symmetry group, the intersection of its full symmetry group with E+(3), which consists of all direct isometries, i.e., isometries preserving orientation. For a bounded object, the proper symmetry group is called its rotation group. It is the intersection of its full symmetry group with SO(3), the full rotation group of the 3D space. The rotation group of a bounded object is equal to its full symmetry group if and only if the object is chiral.

The point groups that are generated purely by a finite set of reflection mirror planes passing through the same point are the finite Coxeter groups, represented by Coxeter notation. 

The point groups in three dimensions are heavily used in chemistry, especially to describe the symmetries of a molecule and of molecular orbitals forming covalent bonds, and in this context they are also called molecular point groups.

3D isometries that leave origin fixed

The symmetry group operations (symmetry operations) are the isometries of three-dimensional space R3 that leave the origin fixed, forming the group O(3). These operations can be categorized as:
The direct (orientation-preserving) symmetry operations, which form the group SO(3):
The identity operation, denoted by E or the identity matrix I.
Rotation about an axis through the origin by an angle θ. Rotation by θ = 360°/n for any positive integer n is denoted Cn (from the Schoenflies notation for the group Cn that it generates). The identity operation, also written C1, is a special case of the rotation operator.
The indirect (orientation-reversing) operations:
Inversion, denoted i or Ci. The matrix notation is −I.
Reflection in a plane through the origin, denoted σ.
Improper rotation, also called rotation-reflection: rotation about an axis by an angle θ, combined with reflection in the plane through the origin perpendicular to the axis. Rotation-reflection by θ = 360°/n for any positive integer n is denoted Sn (from the Schoenflies notation for the group Sn that it generates).
Inversion is a special case of rotation-reflection (i = S2), as is reflection (σ = S1), so these operations are often considered to be improper rotations.

A circumflex is sometimes added to the symbol to indicate an operator, as in Ĉn and Ŝn.

Conjugacy
When comparing the symmetry type of two objects, the origin is chosen for each separately, i.e. they need not have the same center. Moreover, two objects are considered to be of the same symmetry type if their symmetry groups are conjugate subgroups of O(3) (two subgroups H1, H2 of a group G are conjugate, if there exists g ∈ G such that H1 = g−1H2g ).

For example, two 3D objects have the same symmetry type:
if both have mirror symmetry, but with respect to a different mirror plane
if both have 3-fold rotational symmetry, but with respect to a different axis.
In the case of multiple mirror planes and/or axes of rotation, two symmetry groups are of the same symmetry type if and only if there is a rotation mapping the whole structure of the first symmetry group to that of the second. (In fact there will be more than one such rotation, but not an infinite number as when there is only one mirror or axis.) The conjugacy definition would also allow a mirror image of the structure, but this is not needed, the structure itself is achiral. For example, if a symmetry group contains a 3-fold axis of rotation, it contains rotations in two opposite directions. (The structure is chiral for 11 pairs of space groups with a screw axis.)

Infinite isometry groups

There are many infinite isometry groups; for example, the "cyclic group" (meaning that it is generated by one element – not to be confused with a torsion group) generated by a rotation by an irrational number of turns about an axis. We may create non-cyclical abelian groups by adding more rotations around the same axis. The set of points on a circle at rational numbers of degrees around the circle illustrates a point group requiring an infinite number of generators. There are also non-abelian groups generated by rotations around different axes. These are usually (generically) free groups. They will be infinite unless the rotations are specially chosen.

All the infinite groups mentioned so far are not closed as topological subgroups of O(3). We now discuss topologically closed subgroups of O(3).

The whole O(3) is the symmetry group of spherical symmetry; SO(3) is the corresponding rotation group. The other infinite isometry groups consist of all rotations about an axis through the origin, and those with additionally reflection in the planes through the axis, and/or reflection in the plane through the origin, perpendicular to the axis. Those with reflection in the planes through the axis, with or without reflection in the plane through the origin perpendicular to the axis, are the symmetry groups for the two types of cylindrical symmetry. Any 3D shape (subset of R3) having infinite rotational symmetry must also have mirror symmetry for every plane through the axis. Physical objects having infinite rotational symmetry will also have the symmetry of mirror planes through the axis, but vector fields may not, for instance the velocity vectors of a cone rotating about its axis, or the magnetic field surrounding a wire.

There are seven continuous groups which are all in a sense limits of the finite isometry groups. These so called limiting point groups or Curie limiting groups are named after Pierre Curie who was the first to investigate them. The seven infinite series of axial groups lead to five limiting groups (two of them are duplicates), and the seven remaining point groups produce two more continuous groups. In international notation, the list is ∞, ∞2, ∞/m, ∞mm, ∞/mm, ∞∞, and ∞∞m. Not all of these are possible for physical objects, for example objects with ∞∞ symmetry also have ∞∞m symmetry. See below for other designations and more details.

Finite isometry groups
Symmetries in 3D that leave the origin fixed are fully characterized by symmetries on a sphere centered at the origin. For finite 3D point groups, see also spherical symmetry groups.

Up to conjugacy, the set of finite 3D point groups consists of:
, which have at most one more-than-2-fold rotation axis; they are the finite symmetry groups on an infinite cylinder, or equivalently, those on a finite cylinder. They are sometimes called the axial or prismatic point groups.
, which have multiple 3-or-more-fold rotation axes; these groups can also be characterized as point groups having multiple 3-fold rotation axes. The possible combinations are:
Four 3-fold axes (the three tetrahedral symmetries T, Th, and Td)
Four 3-fold axes and three 4-fold axes (octahedral symmetries O and Oh)
Ten 3-fold axes and six 5-fold axes (icosahedral symmetries I and Ih)
According to the crystallographic restriction theorem, only a limited number of point groups are compatible with discrete translational symmetry: 27 from the 7 infinite series, and 5 of the 7 others. Together, these make up the 32 so-called crystallographic point groups.

The seven infinite series of axial groups

The infinite series of axial or prismatic groups have an index n, which can be any integer; in each series, the nth symmetry group contains n-fold rotational symmetry about an axis, i.e. symmetry with respect to a rotation by an angle 360°/n. n=1 covers the cases of no rotational symmetry at all. There are four series with no other axes of rotational symmetry (see cyclic symmetries) and three with additional axes of 2-fold symmetry (see dihedral symmetry). They can be understood as point groups in two dimensions extended with an axial coordinate and reflections in it. They are related to the frieze groups; they can be interpreted as frieze-group patterns repeated n times around a cylinder.

The following table lists several notations for point groups: Hermann–Mauguin notation (used in crystallography), Schönflies notation (used to describe molecular symmetry), orbifold notation, and Coxeter notation. The latter three are not only conveniently related to its properties, but also to the order of the group. The orbifold notation is a unified notation, also applicable for wallpaper groups and frieze groups. The crystallographic groups have n restricted to 1, 2, 3, 4, and 6; removing crystallographic restriction allows any positive integer.
The series are:

For odd n we have Z2n = Zn × Z2 and Dih2n = Dihn × Z2.

The groups Cn (including the trivial C1) and Dn are chiral, the others are achiral.

The terms horizontal (h) and vertical (v), and the corresponding subscripts, refer to the additional mirror plane, that can be parallel to the rotation axis (vertical) or perpendicular to the rotation axis (horizontal).

The simplest nontrivial axial groups are equivalent to the abstract group Z2:
Ci (equivalent to S2) – inversion symmetry
C2 – 2-fold rotational symmetry
Cs (equivalent to C1hand C1v) – reflection symmetry, also called bilateral symmetry.

The second of these is the first of the uniaxial groups (cyclic groups) Cn of order n (also applicable in 2D), which are generated by a single rotation of angle 360°/n.  In addition to this, one may add a mirror plane perpendicular to the axis, giving the group Cnh of order 2n, or a set of n mirror planes containing the axis, giving the group Cnv, also of order 2n. The latter is the symmetry group for a regular n-sided pyramid. A typical object with symmetry group Cn or Dn is a  propeller.

If both horizontal and vertical reflection planes are added, their intersections give n axes of rotation through 180°, so the group is no longer uniaxial.  This new group  of order 4n is called Dnh.  Its subgroup of rotations is the dihedral group Dn of order 2n, which still has the 2-fold rotation axes perpendicular to the primary rotation axis, but no mirror planes.

Note: in 2D, Dn includes reflections, which can also be viewed as flipping over flat objects without distinction of frontside and backside; but in 3D, the two operations are distinguished: Dn contains "flipping over", not reflections.

There is one more group in this family, called Dnd (or Dnv), which has vertical mirror planes containing the main rotation axis, but instead of having a horizontal mirror plane, it has an isometry that combines a reflection in the horizontal plane and a rotation by an angle 180°/n.  Dnh is the symmetry group for a "regular" n-gonal prism and also for a "regular" n-gonal bipyramid. Dnd is the symmetry group for a "regular" n-gonal antiprism, and also for a "regular" n-gonal trapezohedron. Dn is the symmetry group of a partially rotated ("twisted") prism.

The groups D2 and D2h are noteworthy in that there is no special rotation axis. Rather, there are three perpendicular 2-fold axes. D2 is a subgroup of all the polyhedral symmetries (see below), and D2h is a subgroup of the polyhedral groups Th and Oh. D2 occurs in molecules such as twistane and in homotetramers such as Concanavalin A. The elements of D2 are in 1-to-2 correspondence with the rotations given by the unit Lipschitz quaternions.

The group Sn is generated by the combination of a reflection in the horizontal plane and a rotation by an angle 360°/n. For n odd this is equal to the group generated by the two separately, Cnh of order 2n, and therefore the notation Sn is not needed; however, for n even it is distinct, and of order n. Like Dnd it contains a number of improper rotations without containing the corresponding rotations.

All symmetry groups in the 7 infinite series are different, except for the following four pairs of mutually equal ones:
C1h and C1v: group of order 2 with a single reflection (Cs )
D1 and C2: group of order 2 with a single 180° rotation
D1h and C2v: group of order 4 with a reflection in a plane and a 180° rotation through a line in that plane
D1d and C2h: group of order 4 with a reflection in a plane and a 180° rotation through a line perpendicular to that plane.

S2 is the group of order 2 with a single inversion (Ci ).

"Equal" is meant here as the same up to conjugacy in space. This is stronger than "up to algebraic isomorphism". For example, there are three different groups of order two in the first sense, but there is only one in the second sense. Similarly, e.g. S2n is algebraically isomorphic with Z2n.

The groups may be constructed as follows:
 Cn. Generated by an element also called Cn, which corresponds to a rotation by angle 2π/n around the axis. Its elements are E (the identity), Cn, Cn2, ..., Cnn−1, corresponding to rotation angles 0, 2π/n, 4π/n, ..., 2(n − 1)π/n.
 S2n. Generated by element C2nσh, where σh is a reflection in the direction of the axis. Its elements are the elements of Cn with C2nσh, C2n3σh, ..., C2n2n−1σh added.
 Cnh. Generated by element Cn and reflection σh. Its elements are the elements of group Cn, with elements σh, Cnσh, Cn2σh, ..., Cnn−1σh added.
 Cnv. Generated by element Cn and reflection σv in a direction in the plane perpendicular to the axis. Its elements are the elements of group Cn, with elements σv, Cnσv, Cn2σv, ..., Cnn−1σv added.
 Dn. Generated by element Cn and 180° rotation U = σhσv around a direction in the plane perpendicular to the axis. Its elements are the elements of group Cn, with elements U, CnU, Cn2U, ..., Cnn − 1U added.
 Dnd. Generated by elements C2nσh and σv. Its elements are the elements of group Cn and the additional elements of S2n and Cnv, with elements C2nσhσv, C2n3σhσv, ..., C2n2n − 1σhσv added.
 Dnh. Generated by elements Cn, σh, and σv. Its elements are the elements of group Cn and the additional elements of Cnh, Cnv, and Dn.

Groups with continuous axial rotations are designated by putting ∞ in place of n. Note however that C here is not the same as the infinite cyclic group (also sometimes designated C), which is isomorphic to the integers. The following table gives the five continuous axial rotation groups. They are limits of the finite groups only in the sense that they arise when the main rotation is replaced by rotation by an arbitrary angle, so not necessarily a rational number of degrees as with the finite groups. Physical objects can only have C or D symmetry, but vector fields can have the others.

The seven remaining point groups
The remaining point groups are said to be of very high or polyhedral symmetry because they have more than one rotation axis of order greater than 2.  Here, Cn denotes an axis of rotation through 360°/n and Sn denotes an axis of improper rotation through the same. On successive lines are the orbifold notation, the Coxeter notation and Coxeter diagram, and the Hermann–Mauguin notation (full, and abbreviated if different) and the order (number of elements) of the symmetry group.  The groups are:

{| class=wikitable
|- 
|width=100 align=center|T, (332)[3,3]+23order 12|| chiral tetrahedral symmetry||

There are four C3 axes, each  through two vertices of a circumscribing cube (red cube in images), or through one vertex of a regular tetrahedron, and three C2 axes, through the centers of the cube's faces, or the midpoints of the tetrahedron's edges. This group is isomorphic to A4, the alternating group on 4 elements, and is the rotation group for a regular tetrahedron. It is a normal subgroup of Td, Th, and the octahedral symmetries. The elements of the group correspond 1-to-2 to the rotations given by the 24 unit Hurwitz quaternions (the "binary tetrahedral group").
|-
| align=center|Td, (*332)[3,3]3morder 24||full tetrahedral symmetry||

This group is the symmetry group of a regular tetrahedron. This group has the same rotation axes as T, and the C2 axes are now S4 axes. This group has six mirror planes, each containing two edges of the cube or one edge of the tetrahedron, a single S4 axis, and two C3 axes. Td is isomorphic to S4, the symmetric group on 4 letters, because there is a 1-to-1 correspondence between the elements of Td and the 24 permutations of the four 3-fold axes. An object of C3v symmetry under one of the 3-fold axes gives rise under the action of Td to an orbit consisting of four such objects, and Td corresponds to the set of permutations of these four objects. Td is a normal subgroup of Oh. See also the isometries of the regular tetrahedron.
|-
| align=center|Th, (3*2)[3+,4]2/m, m order 24||pyritohedral symmetry|| This group has the same rotation axes as T, with mirror planes parallel to the cube faces. The C3 axes become S6 axes, and there is inversion symmetry. Th is isomorphic to A4 × Z2 (since T and Ci are both normal subgroups), and not to the symmetric group S4. It is the symmetry of a cube with on each face a line segment dividing the face into two equal rectangles, such that the line segments of adjacent faces do not meet at the edge. The symmetries correspond to the even permutations of the body diagonals and the same combined with inversion. It is also the symmetry of a pyritohedron, which is similar to the cube described, with each rectangle replaced by a pentagon with one symmetry axis and 4 equal sides and 1 different side (the one corresponding to the line segment dividing the cube's face); i.e., the cube's faces bulge out at the dividing line and become narrower there. It is a subgroup (but not a normal subgroup) of the full icosahedral symmetry group (as isometry group, not just as abstract group), with 4 of the 10 3-fold axes. It is a normal subgroup of Oh. In spite of being called Th, it does not apply to a tetrahedron.
|-
|align=center|O, (432)[4,3]+432order 24||chiral octahedral symmetry||This group is like T, but the C2 axes are now C4 axes, and additionally there are 6 C2 axes, through the midpoints of the edges of the cube. This group is also isomorphic to S4 because its elements are in 1-to-1 correspondence to the 24 permutations of the 3-fold axes, as with T. An object of D3 symmetry under one of the 3-fold axes gives rise under the action of O to an orbit consisting of four such objects, and O corresponds to the set of permutations of these four objects. It is the rotation group of the cube and octahedron. As before, this is a 1-to-2 correspondence.
|-
|align=center|Oh, (*432)[4,3]4/m2/m, mmorder 48|| full octahedral symmetry||This group has the same rotation axes as O, but with mirror planes, comprising both the mirror planes of Td and Th.  This group is isomorphic to S4 × Z2 (because both O and Ci are normal subgroups), and is the symmetry group of the cube and octahedron. See also the isometries of the cube.
|-
|align=center|I, (532)[5,3]+532order 60||chiral icosahedral symmetry||the rotation group of the icosahedron and the dodecahedron. It is a normal subgroup of index 2 in the full group of symmetries Ih. The group contains 10 versions of D3 and 6 versions  of D5 (rotational symmetries like prisms and antiprisms). It also contains five versions of T (see Compound of five tetrahedra). The group I is isomorphic to A5, the alternating group on 5 letters, since its elements correspond 1-to-1 with even permutations of the five T symmetries (or the five tetrahedra just mentioned). Representing rotations with quaternions, I is made up of the 120 unit icosians. As before, this is a 1-to-2 correspondence.
|-
|align=center|Ih, (*532)[5,3]2/m, morder 120||full icosahedral symmetry||the symmetry group of the icosahedron and the dodecahedron. The group Ih is isomorphic to A5 × Z2 because I and Ci are both normal subgroups. The group contains 10 versions of D3d, 6 versions  of D5d (symmetries like antiprisms), and 5 versions of Th.
|}
The continuous groups related to these groups are:
 ∞∞, K, or SO(3), all possible rotations.
 ∞∞m, Kh''', or O(3), all possible rotations and reflections.
As noted above for the infinite isometry groups, any physical object having K symmetry will also have Kh symmetry.

 Reflective Coxeter groups

The reflective point groups in three dimensions are also called Coxeter groups and can be given by a Coxeter-Dynkin diagram and represent a set of mirrors that intersect at one central point. Coxeter notation offers a bracketed notation equivalent to the Coxeter diagram, with markup symbols for rotational and other subsymmetry point groups. In Schoenflies notation, the reflective point groups in 3D are Cnv, Dnh, and the full polyhedral groups T, O, and I.

The mirror planes bound a set of spherical triangle domains on the surface of a sphere. A rank n Coxeter group has n mirror planes. Coxeter groups having fewer than 3 generators have degenerate spherical triangle domains, as lunes or a hemisphere. In Coxeter notation these groups are tetrahedral symmetry [3,3], octahedral symmetry [4,3], icosahedral symmetry [5,3], and dihedral symmetry [p,2]. The number of mirrors for an irreducible group is nh/2, where h is the Coxeter group's Coxeter number, n is the dimension (3).<ref>Coxeter, Regular polytopes', §12.6 The number of reflections, equation 12.61</ref>

Rotation groups
The rotation groups, i.e. the finite subgroups of SO(3), are: the cyclic groups Cn (the rotation group of a canonical pyramid), the dihedral groups Dn (the rotation group of a uniform prism, or canonical bipyramid), and the rotation groups T, O and I of a regular tetrahedron, octahedron/cube and icosahedron/dodecahedron.

In particular, the dihedral groups D3, D4 etc. are the rotation groups of plane regular polygons embedded in three-dimensional space, and such a figure may be considered as a degenerate regular prism. Therefore, it is also called a dihedron (Greek: solid with two faces), which explains the name dihedral group.

An object having symmetry group Cn, Cnh, Cnv or  S2n has rotation group Cn.
An object having symmetry group Dn, Dnh, or Dnd has rotation group Dn.
An object having a polyhedral symmetry (T, Td, Th, O, Oh, I or Ih) has as its rotation group the corresponding one without a subscript: T, O or I.

The rotation group of an object is equal to its full symmetry group if and only if the object is chiral. In other words, the chiral objects are those with their symmetry group in the list of rotation groups.

Given in Schönflies notation, Coxeter notation, (orbifold notation), the rotation subgroups are:

Correspondence between rotation groups and other groups

Groups containing inversion
The rotation group SO(3) is a subgroup of O(3), the full point rotation group of the 3D Euclidean space. Correspondingly, O(3) is the direct product of SO(3) and the inversion group Ci (where inversion is denoted by its matrix −I):
O(3) = SO(3) × { I , −I }

Thus there is a 1-to-1 correspondence between all direct isometries and all indirect isometries, through inversion. Also there is a 1-to-1 correspondence between all groups H of direct isometries in SO(3) and all groups K of isometries in O(3) that contain inversion:
K = H × { I , −I }
H = K ∩ SO(3)
where the isometry ( A, I ) is identified with A.

For finite groups, the correspondence is:

Groups containing indirect isometries but no inversion
If a group of direct isometries H has a subgroup L of index 2, then there is a corresponding group that contains indirect isometries but no inversion:
M = L ∪ ( (H ∖ L) × { −I } ) 

For example, H = C4 corresponds to M = S4.

This group M is, when considered as an abstract group, isomorphic to H. Conversely, for all point groups M that contain indirect isometries but no inversion we can obtain a rotation group H by inverting the indirect isometries. 

For finite groups, the correspondence is:

Normal subgroups

In 2D, the cyclic group of k-fold rotations Ck is for every positive integer k a normal subgroup of O(2) and SO(2). Accordingly, in 3D, for every axis the cyclic group of k-fold rotations about that axis is a normal subgroup of the group of all rotations about that axis. Since any subgroup of index two is normal, the group of rotations (Cn) is normal both in the group (Cnv) obtained by adding to (Cn) reflection planes through its axis and in the group (Cnh) obtained by adding to (Cn) a reflection plane perpendicular to its axis.

Maximal symmetries
There are two discrete point groups with the property that no discrete point group has it as proper subgroup: Oh and Ih. Their largest common subgroup is Th. The two groups are obtained from it by changing 2-fold rotational symmetry to 4-fold, and adding 5-fold symmetry, respectively.

There are two crystallographic point groups with the property that no crystallographic point group has it as proper subgroup: Oh and D6h. Their maximal common subgroups, depending on orientation, are D3d and D2h.

The groups arranged by abstract group type
Below the groups explained above are arranged by abstract group type.

The smallest abstract groups that are not any symmetry group in 3D, are the quaternion group (of order 8), Z3 × Z3 (of order 9), the dicyclic group Dic3 (of order 12), and 10 of the 14 groups of order 16.

The column "# of order 2 elements" in the following tables shows the total number of isometry subgroups of types C2, Ci, Cs. This total number is one of the characteristics helping to distinguish the various abstract group types, while their isometry type helps to distinguish the various isometry groups of the same abstract group.

Within the possibilities of isometry groups in 3D, there are infinitely many abstract group types with 0, 1 and 3 elements of order 2, there are two with 4n + 1 elements of order 2, and there are three with 4n + 3 elements of order 2 (for each n ≥ 8 ). There is never a positive even number of elements of order 2.

Symmetry groups in 3D that are cyclic as abstract group
The symmetry group for n-fold rotational symmetry is Cn; its abstract group type is cyclic group Zn, which is also denoted by Cn. However, there are two more infinite series of symmetry groups with this abstract group type:
For even order 2n there is the group S2n (Schoenflies notation) generated by a rotation by an angle 180°/n about an axis, combined with a reflection in the plane perpendicular to the axis. For S2 the notation Ci is used; it is generated by inversion.
For any order 2n where n is odd, we have Cnh; it has an n-fold rotation axis, and a perpendicular plane of reflection. It is generated by a rotation by an angle 360°/n about the axis, combined with the reflection. For C1h the notation Cs is used; it is generated by reflection in a plane.

Thus we have, with bolding of the 10 cyclic crystallographic point groups, for which the crystallographic restriction applies:

etc.

Symmetry groups in 3D that are dihedral as abstract group
In 2D dihedral group Dn includes reflections, which can also be viewed as flipping over flat objects without distinction of front- and backside.

However, in 3D the two operations are distinguished: the symmetry group denoted by Dn contains n 2-fold axes perpendicular to the n-fold axis, not reflections. Dn is the rotation group of the n-sided prism with regular base, and n-sided bipyramid with regular base, and also of a regular, n-sided antiprism and of a regular, n-sided trapezohedron. The group is also the full symmetry group of such objects after making them chiral by e.g. an identical chiral marking on every face, or some modification in the shape.

The abstract group type is dihedral group Dihn, which is also denoted by Dn. However, there are three more infinite series of symmetry groups with this abstract group type:

Cnv of order 2n, the symmetry group of a regular n-sided pyramid
Dnd of order 4n, the symmetry group of a regular n-sided antiprism
Dnh of order 4n for odd n. For n = 1 we get D2, already covered above, so n ≥ 3.

Note the following property:
Dih4n+2  Dih2n+1 × Z2

Thus we have, with bolding of the 12 crystallographic point groups, and writing D1d as the equivalent C2h:

etc.

Other
C2n,h of order 4n is of abstract group type Z2n × Z2. For n = 1 we get Dih2, already covered above, so n ≥ 2.

Thus we have, with bolding of the 2 cyclic crystallographic point groups:

etc.

Dnh of order 4n is of abstract group type Dihn × Z2. For odd n this is already covered above, so we have here D2nh of order 8n, which is of abstract group type Dih2n × Z2 (n≥1).

Thus we have, with bolding of the 3 dihedral crystallographic point groups:

etc.

The remaining seven are, with bolding of the 5 crystallographic point groups (see also above):

Fundamental domain

The fundamental domain of a point group is a conic solid. An object with a given symmetry in a given orientation is characterized by the fundamental domain. If the object is a surface it is characterized by a surface in the fundamental domain continuing to its radial bordal faces or surface. If the copies of the surface do not fit, radial faces or surfaces can be added. They fit anyway if the fundamental domain is bounded by reflection planes.

For a polyhedron this surface in the fundamental domain can be part of an arbitrary plane. For example, in the disdyakis triacontahedron one full face is a fundamental domain of icosahedral symmetry. Adjusting the orientation of the plane gives various possibilities of combining two or more adjacent faces to one, giving various other polyhedra with the same symmetry. The polyhedron is convex if the surface fits to its copies and the radial line perpendicular to the plane is in the fundamental domain.

Also the surface in the fundamental domain may be composed of multiple faces.

Binary polyhedral groups
The map Spin(3) → SO(3) is the double cover of the rotation group by the spin group in 3 dimensions. (This is the only connected cover of SO(3), since Spin(3) is simply connected.)
By the lattice theorem, there is a Galois connection between subgroups of Spin(3) and subgroups of SO(3) (rotational point groups): the image of a subgroup of Spin(3) is a rotational point group, and the preimage of a point group is a subgroup of Spin(3). (Note that Spin(3) has alternative descriptions as the special unitary group SU(2) and as the group of unit quaternions. Topologically, this Lie group is the 3-dimensional sphere S3.) 

The preimage of a finite point group is called a binary polyhedral group, represented as ⟨l,n,m⟩, and is called by the same name as its point group, with the prefix binary, with double the order of the related polyhedral group (l,m,n). For instance, the preimage of the icosahedral group (2,3,5) is the binary icosahedral group, ⟨2,3,5⟩.

The binary polyhedral groups are:
 : binary cyclic group of an (n + 1)-gon, order 2n
 : binary dihedral group of an n-gon, ⟨2,2,n⟩, order 4n
 : binary tetrahedral group, ⟨2,3,3⟩, order 24
 : binary octahedral group, ⟨2,3,4⟩, order 48
 : binary icosahedral group, ⟨2,3,5⟩, order 120
These are classified by the ADE classification, and the quotient of C'2 by the action of a binary polyhedral group is a Du Val singularity.

For point groups that reverse orientation, the situation is more complicated, as there are two pin groups, so there are two possible binary groups corresponding to a given point group.

Note that this is a covering of groups, not a covering of spaces – the sphere is simply connected, and thus has no covering spaces. There is thus no notion of a "binary polyhedron" that covers a 3-dimensional polyhedron. Binary polyhedral groups are discrete subgroups of a Spin group, and under a representation of the spin group act on a vector space, and may stabilize a polyhedron in this representation – under the map Spin(3) → SO(3) they act on the same polyhedron that the underlying (non-binary) group acts on, while under spin representations or other representations they may stabilize other polyhedra.

This is in contrast to projective polyhedra – the sphere does cover projective space (and also lens spaces), and thus a tessellation of projective space or lens space yields a distinct notion of polyhedron.

See also

List of spherical symmetry groups
List of character tables for chemically important 3D point groups
Point groups in two dimensions
Point groups in four dimensions
Symmetry
Euclidean plane isometry
Group action
Point group
Crystal system
Space group
List of small groups
Molecular symmetry

Footnotes

References

 .
 6.5 The binary polyhedral groups, p. 68

External links
Graphic overview of the 32 crystallographic point groups – form the first parts (apart from skipping n''=5) of the 7 infinite series and 5 of the 7 separate 3D point groups
Overview of properties of point groups
Simplest Canonical Polyhedra of Each Symmetry Type (uses Java)
Point Groups and Crystal Systems, by Yi-Shu Wei, pp. 4–6
 The Geometry Center: 10.1 Formulas for Symmetries in Cartesian Coordinates (three dimensions)

Euclidean symmetries
Group theory